Medicare Advantage (Medicare Part C, MA) is a capitated program for providing Medicare benefits in the United States. Under Part C, Medicare pays a private-sector health insurer a fixed payment. The insurer then pays for the health care expenses of enrollees. Insurers are allowed to vary the benefits from those provided by Medicare's other parts.

Part C plans are required to offer coverage that meets or exceeds the standards set by the other parts, but they do not have to cover every benefit in the same way (actuarial equivalence is required). Plans must be approved by the Centers for Medicare and Medicaid Services (CMS). If a MA plan reduces some benefits, the savings may be passed along to consumers by lowering co-payments for doctor visits (or any other plus or minus aggregation approved by CMS). Coverage must include inpatient hospital (Part A) and outpatient (Part B) services. Typically, the plan also includes prescription drug (Part D) coverage. Many plans also offer additional benefits, such as dental coverage or gym membership. Such plans typically require a higher premium.

Those who do not enroll in a Part C plan receive coverage for Part A and Part B services. Many purchase supplemental coverage (Medigap) to cover services not covered by Medicare, and enroll in Part D for coverage of prescription drugs.

Most MA plans are managed care plans (e.g., PPOs or HMOs) with limited provider networks. About 40% of Medicare Advantage enrollees with prescription drug benefits pay an additional premium. MA plans typically include an annual out-of-pocket spending limit.

Original Medicare and Medicare Advantage pay healthcare providers differently. Original Medicare typically reimburses healthcare providers with a fee for each service.  This fee is often calculated with a standard formula (for example, the prospective payment system for hospital services). Providers either accept Medicare's reimbursement rates or opt out of the program. Medicare Advantage plans negotiate payment rates and form networks with healthcare providers, similar to other private health insurance plans.

As of 2022, about 48% of Medicare beneficiaries were covered under Medicare Advantage plans. Nearly all Medicare beneficiaries have access to at least one Medicare Advantage plan; on average 39 plans per county were available. Medicare Advantage plan costs in 2008 averaged 12% more than Original Medicare.

Other plan types, such as 1876 Cost plans, are available in some areas. Cost plans are not Medicare Advantage plans and are not capitated. Instead, beneficiaries keep their Original Medicare benefits while the plan sponsor administers their Part A and Part B benefits. The sponsor of a Part C plan could be an integrated health delivery system or spin-out, a union, a religious organization, an insurance company or other type of organization.

Medicare + Medicaid 
Some MA plans cover both Medicare and Medicaid services for people who are eligible for both.

Value-based Insurance Design 
The CMS Innovation Center's Medicare Advantage Value-Based Insurance Design (VBID) model tests the effect of offering customized benefits that are designed to better manage their disease(s) and address social needs, including food insecurity and social isolation. The VBID Hospice Benefit Component provides access to palliative/hospice services.

Usage 
The number of people using public Part C of Medicare grew from almost zero since 1998 to 26.5 million in 2021. The top-25 Medicare Advantage insurers enroll a combined 21.6 million people, or 87 percent of the total.  Nine plans saw growth over 10% in 2021.

In 2022, 295 plans (up from 256 in 2021) covered all Medicare services, plus Medicaid-covered behavioral health treatment or long term services and support.

In 2022, 1000 MA plans were projected to enroll 3.7 million people in VBID. The hospice benefit will be offered by 115 Medicare Advantage plans in 22 states and territories.

History 
The Balanced Budget Act of 1997 created Part C, known then as the Medicare+Choice (M+C) program, effective January 1999. A similar option was previously available via a series of demonstration projects dating to the early 1970s. M+C was renamed the Medicare Advantage (MA) Program under the Medicare Prescription Drug, Improvement, and Modernization Act of 2003 (MMA).

The MMA updated and improved the choice of plans under Part C, and changed the way benefits are established and payments are made. The MMA further established the Medicare prescription drug benefit (Part D) program, and amended the Part C program to allow (and, for organizations offering coordinated care plans, require) most MA plans to offer prescription drug coverage.

One reason for the creation of Medicare Advantage was to house all services under a single plan. Under Original Medicare (plus Part D), one payer covers hospital and outpatient care and another covers prescription drugs. The Part D provider attempts to keep their costs low by encouraging the use of hospital and other services. By contrast the Part A/B provider attempts to keep their costs low by encouraging the use of drugs instead of other services. Neither provider is encouraged to keep overall costs low (by optimizing services provided.)

References

External links

Government links - current
CMS official web site
Legal Issues Relating to the Secretary’s Authority to Set Payment Rates Under the Medicare Advantage Program Congressional Research Service
Medicare.gov — the official website for people with Medicare
 As codified in 42 U.S.C. chapter 7 of the United States Code from the LII
 As codified in 42 U.S.C. chapter 7 of the United States Code from the US House of Representatives

Private links
Medicare & Medicaid Resources — Medicare information site
Kaiser Family Foundation — Wide range of free information about the Medicare program and other U.S. health issues including state-level data on health care spending and utilization, including MedicareMedicare Advantage in 2022: Enrollment Update and Key Trends.
 Medicare - Alliance for Health Reform The nonpartisan, nonprofit Alliance for Health Reform offers information about health reform, in a number of formats, to elected officials and their staffs, journalists, policy analysts and advocates.
 Social Security and Disability News Resource Center
 How Stuff Works - Medicare
 Medicare Policy Center

Managed care
Medicare and Medicaid (United States)